Chetla is a neighbourhood of South Kolkata in Kolkata district of the Indian state of West Bengal.

Geography

Police district
Chetla police station is part of the South division of Kolkata Police and is located at 19/4 Pitamber Ghatak Lane, Kolkata-700027.  

See also –  Chetla police station boundary map

Tollygunge Womens police station has jurisdiction over all the police districts in the South Division, i.e. Park Street, Shakespeare Sarani, Alipore, Hastings, Maidan, Bhowanipore, Kalighat, Tollygunge, Charu Market, New Alipur and Chetla.

Culture
The renovated nabaratna temple of the Mandal family in Chetla is the largest and most important temple of this type in south Kolkata.

References

External links
  

Neighbourhoods in Kolkata